Downtown San José station is a proposed underground Bay Area Rapid Transit station underneath Santa Clara Street in Downtown San Jose, planned as part of Silicon Valley BART  extension Phase II. The station would be co-located with the Santa Clara Valley Transportation Authority's existing Santa Clara light rail station, and be located between the proposed 28th Street/Little Portugal station and a transfer station at San Jose Diridon Station.  The station eventually connects to the proposed Santa Clara BART station.
Revenue service is envisioned to start in 2029–2030.

History
The original plan for the Silicon Valley BART extension included the Downtown San José station, but full funding could not be secured
and the San Jose extension was split into two phases. Phase I, completed on June 13, 2020, was the extension to Berryessa/North San José station.
The proposed Downtown San José station is part of a later, unfunded phase II of the Silicon Valley BART extension and would be located between the proposed 28th Street/Little Portugal and Diridon BART stations. Construction is planned to begin in 2022, and revenue service to start in 2029–2030.

References

Future Bay Area Rapid Transit stations
Railway stations scheduled to open in 2029
Railway stations located underground in California
Bay Area Rapid Transit stations in Santa Clara County, California